Ammocleonus hieroglyphicus, the desert weevil, is a species of cylindrical weevil belonging to the family Curculionidae.

Description 

Distribution 
This species is widespread in Africa and Asia.

References 

 Biolib
 Zipcodezoo
 Species Accounts
 CURCULIONIDAE of LIBYA

Lixinae
Beetles described in 1807